Paul Holzki (28 September 1887  in  Saadan, Ortelsburg district - 26 January 1960) was a German cinematographer. He worked with Leni Riefenstahl on the 1938 documentary Olympia.

Selected filmography
 Violet (1921)
 The Eternal Curse (1921)
 The Black Panther (1921)
 Die schwarze Paula (1922)
 Die Kreutzersonate (1922)
 The Big Shot (1922)
 The Mistress of the King (1922)
 Insulted and Humiliated (1922)
 The Marriage of Princess Demidoff (1922)
 Yvette, the Fashion Princesss (1922)
 Gold and Luck (1923)
 The Girl from Hell (1923)
 The Little Duke (1924)
 Goetz von Berlichingen of the Iron Hand (1925)
 The Doll of Luna Park (1925)
 Golden Boy (1925)
 White Slave Traffic (1926)
 Endangered Girls (1927)
 Mach' mir die Welt zum Paradies (1930)
 The Last Performance of the Circus Wolfson (1928)
 Big City Children (1929)

Bibliography
Rother, Rainer & Bott, Martin H. Leni Riefenstahl: The Seduction of Genius.Continuum International Publishing 2003.

External links

1887 births
1960 deaths
German cinematographers
People from East Prussia
People from Szczytno